A dry-hole clause is a provision in an oil or Natural gas lease specifying what a lessee must do to maintain the lease for the remainder of a primary term after drilling a "dry hole."  Usually, the lessee will just have to pay delay rentals.

A dry-hole clause is a provision in a contract that is used to allocate the risks and costs associated with drilling for oil or natural gas in the event that the drilling does not result in the discovery of a viable resource.

In the oil and gas industry, exploration and production activities can be extremely expensive, and there is always the risk that a well will not produce the expected results.

A dry-hole clause is used to specify how the costs of drilling a dry hole (a well that does not produce a viable resource) will be shared between the parties involved in the project.

The specific terms of a dry-hole clause will depend on the specific circumstances of the project and the agreements that have been made between the parties involved.

Leading cases

Superior Oil Co. v. Stanolind Oil & Gas Co., 150 Tex. 317, 240 S.W.2d 281 (1951)

Murphy v. Garfield Oil Co., 98 Okla. 273, 225 P. 676 (1923)

Petroleum industry
Oil and gas law
Contract clauses